António de Jesus (died ) was a Portuguese figure who flourished in late 17th and early 18th century Safavid Iran. Originally an Augustinian friar and missionary, he converted to Shia Islam during the early reign of Shah (King) Sultan Husayn (1694–1722) and took the name Aliqoli Jadid-ol-Eslam. He subsequently became an apologist of Shi'ism as well as a major polemicist against Christianity, Sufism, Judaism, Sunnism, philosophers and antinomians. In addition, after conversion, he served as an official interpreter (also known as a dragoman) at the royal court in Isfahan. Aliqoli Jadid-ol-Eslam was one of the late 17th century converts in Iran who "helped reaffirm the Majlesi brand of conservatism".

Biography

Not many details are known about Aliqoli's life. He was born sometime during the second half of the 17th century in Portugal, and was originally an Augustinian friar and missionary named António de Jesus. He arrived in Isfahan, the Safavid royal capital, in 1691 at the latest. There he initially served in the retinue of Gaspar dos Reis, then head of the city's Augustinian monastery, before succeeding him in the post. He reportedly played an important role in the contacts between Portuguese diplomats and the Shah's government "at a time of an attempted Portuguese-Iranian alliance against the sultans of Oman in the Persian Gulf".

He converted to Shia Islam in Isfahan during the early reign of Shah (King) Sultan Husayn (1694–1722) and took the name Aliqoli Jadid-ol-Eslam. There is no consensus on the date of his conversion. Reza Pourjavady and Sabine Schmidtke (2009) state that he converted in 1696, while according to Joao Teles e Cunha (2009), Abbas Amanat (2017) and Giorgio Rota (2017) he converted in 1697. According to Alberto Tiburcio (2018), "it certainly took place between 1694 and 1697". The precise reason for his conversion remains unknown. However, it is known that he corresponded with the long-time Capuchin resident of Isfahan, Raphael du Mans, about his intentions, and that he "felt disappointed by the way many missionaries bribed Muslims into conversion". Aliqoli Jadid-ol-Eslam's life bears similarities to that of his fellow former Augustinian missionary, Manuel de Santa Maria, who also lived in Iran and who took the name Hasan-Qoli Beg after embracing Islam.

After apostatising, Aliqoli became an apologist for Shia Islam as well as a major polemicist against Christianity, Sufism and Judaism. In addition, after conversion, he served as a dragoman, a translator and interpreter of European languages, at the Shah's court in Isfahan, succeeding du Mans to the post. Aliqoli was one of the late 17th century converts in Iran who "helped reaffirm the Majlesi brand of conservatism"; his appointment as royal dragoman further confirmed the Safavid state's "patronage of a prevailing xenophobic tendency". Tiburcio notes that according to one source, Aliqoli may have played a role in the persecution of the Catholic Armenian Shahremanian (Sceriman) family. He displayed detailed knowledge of Shi'ite intellectual history in at least one of his works, which also referenced Church historians. However, not all of his writings are extant, and of those works that survive, not all are fully preserved.

Aliqoli is known to have married. According to an August 1710 letter written by Louis-Marie Pidou de Saint-Olon, the Bishop of Babylon, his health had declined by that time, and he was reportedly suffering from pulmonary tuberculosis. Aliqoli died , probably in Isfahan, though the precise location remains uncertain.

Works
Aliqoli wrote several works (treatises) in the field of interreligious polemics. These include:
 Hedayat ol-dallin (or ol-modallin) va-taqviyat ol-mo'menin ("Guidance for those who are led (or who lead) astray and strengthening for the believers"), consisting of four volumes. It was Aliqoli's first major work and was probably written around 1708 in either Portuguese or Latin. It was immediately translated into Persian. He dedicated the work to Shah Sultan Husayn. The Persian version exists in several manuscripts, but none of these is complete.
 Sayf ol-mo'menin fi qetal ol-moshrekin ("The sword of the faithful in the fight against the associators"). This was Aliqoli's second major work; written in Persian, it was completed on 2 June 1711.
 Fava'ed-e ezdevaj ("The benefits of marriage"). One of his minor works, it was probably completed before 1711 and was written in Persian.
 Resaleh dar radd-e jama'at-e sufiyan ("Treatise in refutation of the community of Sufis"). One of his minor works. Probably completed before 1711, it was written in Persian.

Notes

References

Sources

Further reading
 

17th-century births
1722 deaths
17th-century Portuguese writers
Portuguese Roman Catholic missionaries
17th-century writers of Safavid Iran
18th-century writers of Safavid Iran
Converts to Shia Islam from Catholicism
Former Roman Catholics
Augustinian friars
18th-century Persian-language writers
Dragomans
Critics of Sunni Islam
Critics of Christianity
Critics of Judaism
Portuguese Shia Muslims
Portuguese emigrants to Iran
Roman Catholic missionaries in Iran
Missionary linguists
18th-century Portuguese writers